Throughout its long history since its inception on March 9, 1831, elements of the French Foreign Legion have engaged in combat on the behalf of France and its interests with distinction. The Foreign Legion has seen battle on five different continents against numerous foes.

Afghanistan War

Gulf War

Peacekeeping Operations

Algerian War

Indochina War

Second World War

Rif War

First World War

Sino-French War

Franco-Prussian War

Mexican Campaign

Italian Campaign (1859)

Crimean War

Second Deployment to Algeria

First Carlist War

First Deployment to Algeria

See also
History of the French Foreign Legion
List of Commanders of the French Foreign Legion

References

French Foreign Legion